Saronno–Novara railway is a railway line in Lombardy, Italy.

It is one of the three continuations of the Milan-Saronno railway.

History 
The line was opened by the FNS in two parts in 1887:
 27 June 1887: Novara (FNS)–Busto Arsizio (FNS)
 5 October 1887: Busto Arsizio (FNS)–Saronno

The stations in Novara and in Busto Arsizio were connected by two railway junctions to the state railway stations:
 Novara (FNS)–Novara (RM), opened on 27 June 1887
 Busto Arsizio (FNS)–Busto Arsizio (RM), opened on 21 October 1887

A line for Malpensa Airport starts from Busto Arsizio Nord railway station.

See also 
 List of railway lines in Italy

References 

 Ferrovienord - Prospetto informativo della rete

External links 

Railway lines in Lombardy
Railway lines in Piedmont
Railway lines opened in 1887
1887 establishments in Italy